As of 2007, Uzbekistan's overland transportation infrastructure declined significantly in the post-Soviet era due to low investment and poor maintenance. Air transport was the only branch that received substantial government investment in the early 2000s, as airport modernization projects were undertaken. In the following years, improvements have been made to the surface transport network including the construction of the Tashkent–Samarkand high-speed rail line.

Railways

Highways

The road infrastructure is deteriorating, particularly outside of Tashkent. No significant highway projects were underway in 2006. In the early 2000s, U.S. engineers improved some roads around the port of Termez to facilitate movement of humanitarian supplies to Afghanistan. Uzbekistan is a member country of the United Nations’ Asian Highway Network, and several national roads are designated as part of the network.

There are some parts of the roads considered as freeways, although mostly in a state of complete neglect and disrepair since the collapse of the Soviet Union.

In January, 2017, the Kazakhstan and Uzbekistan governments made an agreement to reopen the  section of this highway which passed through Kazakhstan that had been closed for ten years, avoiding the detour via Guliston. The M37 Highway starts from Samarkand, reaching west to the Turkmen border, via Navoiy and Bukhara. The A373 Highway starts from Tashkent, going east through Kokand of Fergana Region, and ends at the Kyrgyz border.

Ports and waterways
Double landlocked Uzbekistan has no seaports. Its main river port is Termez on the Amu Darya river. Although Termez lacks modern facilities and has a shortage of spare parts, activity there has increased as conditions in neighboring Afghanistan have stabilized. Termez has been an important transfer point for humanitarian supplies entering Afghanistan.

Uzbekistan has  of inland waterways. Since the mid-1990s, commercial travel on Uzbekistan's portion of the Amu Darya has been reduced because of low water levels.

Pipelines

Airports
The largest of them, Tashkent International Airport, is linked with European and Middle Eastern cities by direct flights of Aeroflot, Lufthansa, and Turkish Airlines, and with New York and Los Angeles via connecting flights through Moscow. The national airline, Uzbek Havo Yollari (Uzbekistan Airlines), flies mainly within the former Soviet Union.
In August 2010, Hanjin Group, the parent of Korean Airlines, opened a new cargo terminal at Navoi, which will become a cargo hub with regular Incheon-Navoi-Milan flights.

See also

 North-South Transport Corridor
 Ashgabat agreement, a Multimodal transport agreement signed by India, Oman, Iran, Turkmenistan, Uzbekistan and Kazakhstan, for creating an international transport and transit corridor facilitating transportation of goods between Central Asia and the Persian Gulf.

References

External links